A party wall (occasionally parti-wall or parting wall, also known as common wall or as a demising wall) is a wall shared by two adjoining properties.. Typically, the builder lays the wall along a property line dividing two terraced houses, so that one half of the wall's thickness lies on each side. This type of wall is usually structural. Party walls can also be formed by two abutting walls built at different times. The term can be also used to describe a division between separate units within a multi-unit apartment complex. Very often the wall in this case is non-structural but designed to meet established criteria for sound and/or fire protection, i.e. a firewall.

Waterproofing 
A waterproofing membrane can extend 6" up a demising walls as well as under the wall.

England and Wales
While party walls are effectively in common ownership of two or more immediately adjacent owners, there are various possibilities for legal ownership: the wall may belong to both tenants (in common), to one tenant or the other, or partly to one, partly to the other. In cases where the ownership is not shared, both parties have use of the wall, if not ownership. Other party structures can exist, such as floors dividing flats or apartments.

Apart from special statutory definitions, the term "Party Wall" may be used in four different legal senses.  
It may mean:
 a wall of which the adjoining owners are tenants in common; 
 a wall divided longitudinally into two strips, one belonging to each of the neighbouring owners; 
 a wall which belongs entirely to one of the adjoining owners, but is subject to an easement or right in the other to have it maintained as a dividing wall between the two tenements; 
 a wall divided longitudinally into two moieties, each moiety being subject to a cross easement, in favour of the owner of the other moiety.

In English law the party wall does not confirm a boundary at its median point and there are instances where the legal boundary between adjoining lands actually comes at one face or the other of a wall or part of it, and sometimes at some odd measurement within the thickness of the wall. The legal position is, however, clear insofar as a party using or benefiting from a party wall or structure abutting, on or in its land has rights to use the wall and for it to be retained should the other side no longer wish it to be there. For this reason, expert surveyors are used in the main to issue notices, deal with the response from someone receiving a notice and settling any dispute by an Award. Details can be obtained from the Royal Institution of Chartered Surveyors.

Originating in London as early as the 11th century, requirements for terraced houses to have a dividing wall substantially capable of acting as a fire break have been applied in some form or other. Evidently, this was not enough to prevent the several great fires of London, and the most famous of which being the Great Fire of 1666.

In England and Wales, the Party Wall etc. Act 1996, confers rights on those whose property adjoins a party wall or other 'party structure' irrespective of ownership of the wall or structure.

Paris

The principles of the party wall in Paris under the common law in 1765  are the following:

 If a man when building his home does not leave a sufficient space on his property he can not prevent his wall becoming a party wall with his neighbor who could build his home erect to the wall paying half the cost for materials and land that the wall resides on.
 Nothing can be done to the party wall without legal consent of both neighboring parties. 
 Repairs to the wall are split equally between the two neighboring parties. 
 No beams (of a home) can be placed in the walls by either party more than a one-half inch the thickness of the wall. If a party does wish to install beams into the wall greater than one-half inch thickness of the wall then materials such as jams, or chains must also be added in order to support the beams.

United States
In the United States, the term may refer to a fire wall that separates and is used in common by two adjoining buildings (condominium, row house), or the wall between two adjacent commercial buildings that were often built using common walls, or built walls onto existing walls. Rights and obligations are governed by state statutes, and common law.

The wall starts at the foundation and continues up to a parapet, creating two separate and structurally independent buildings on either side.

See also
 Right to light
 Architectural acoustics
 Property law
 Semi-detached housing
 Condominium
 Partition wall

References

 
 Party wall guidance Royal Institution of Chartered Surveyors (RICS)
 "Paris Party Wall", The Encyclopedia of Diderot & d'Alembert Collaborative Translation Project

Surveying
Types of wall